Show Lo Chih Hsiang (born July 30, 1979) is a Taiwanese singer, actor and host. He is commonly known by his nickname Hsiao Chu (Little Pig). Lo is recognized for his trademark dance music and comedic talent. He has over 50 million followers on Chinese micro-blogging platform Weibo as of June 2018.

Show Lo debuted as a member of Taiwanese boy group in 1996 after winning a singing and dancing competition, and began his solo music career in 2003 when he released his first studio album Show Time. His successive albums were commercially successful; he achieved best-selling album of the year in Taiwan for four consecutive years from 2010 to 2013. He holds many records in the Taiwanese music industry, including being the first pop singer to hold a concert in Taipei Arena in 2005, and the first pop singer to hold three concerts within twenty-four hours in Taipei Arena in 2010. As of May 2018, he has gone on four world tours. His 2010 舞法舞天 (Dance without Limits) World Tour ran for two-and-a-half years, visiting forty-two cities and attracting 600,000 spectators. Lo is fluent in Japanese and released his first Japanese single EP Dante in 2012. The song clinched 5th place in Japan's Oricon daily charts on its first day of release and remained at 10th place in the Oricon weekly charts, making him the first Taiwanese male singer to place on the chart.

Besides his singing career, Show Lo is a successful television host and entertainer. He has been hosting 100% Entertainment since 2001. In 2017, he won the Best Host for a Variety Show Award in the 52nd Golden Bell Awards for 100% Entertainment, with co-host Linda Chien. He is also recognized as a member of the cast for the popular Chinese reality show, Go Fighting!, and as a judge on China's Produce 101 and Street Dance of China.

Show Lo was nominated thrice for Best Male Actor in the Golden Bell Awards. In 2013, Lo was handpicked by director Stephen Chow to play the guest role of Prince Important in the movie Journey to the West: Conquering the Demons, which broke Chinese box office records. Chow cast Lo again in a supporting role, Octopus, in his 2016 movie The Mermaid, likening his comedic talent onscreen to a formidable explosive. The movie once again broke existing Chinese box office records.

In 2006, Show Lo created fashion brand STAGE which currently has branches in Taiwan, Hong Kong, and Singapore. STAGE sponsors clothing for many Taiwanese entertainers, and the brand is often seen on Taiwanese variety shows.

Early life 
Show Lo was born in Keelung City, Taiwan. His father is Han Taiwanese and his mother is Amis of the Taiwanese indigenous peoples. He is an only child, and his parents held multiple odd jobs to support the family when he was growing up. They primarily put up entertainment shows for grassroots events such as weddings, in which his father hosted and his mother sang. Show participated in these entertainment shows as a child, playing the drums onstage when he was just three.

He was bullied by his classmates for his weight, which made him determined to slim down. During the summer break of his first year in middle school, Show swam and played basketball everyday, shedding weight and reaching  within two months.

Show picked up street dance when he was in middle school and was a member of a street dance group, participating in many dancing competitions in Taiwan. He auditioned successfully for Taipei Hwa Kang Arts School, but was only enrolled there for one school term as his family was unable to afford the school fees. He returned to Keelung and enrolled in Pei De high school's media production course.

Career

1996–2002: Debut 
In 1996, Show entered and won a singing and dancing competition, impersonating Aaron Kwok. He debuted as member of boy group Four Heavenly Kings with three other contestants who impersonated the other Hong Kong Four Heavenly Kings. The boy group disbanded in 1998 as two members left for compulsory military service, which Show was exempted from because he has Gluteal Fibrotic Contracture. He also suffers from Mitral insufficiency and hence cannot consume food containing caffeine. That same year, he formed a new boy group Romeo with Ou Di. They released two albums, but the group soon disbanded too.

From 2000 to 2002, Show's singing career was stalled by a lawsuit with his former management company. He was forced to transit from a teen idol to a variety show entertainer, performing gags on variety shows. His transition into hosting comedy game shows was successful, and he earned the "Triple Crown" title for hosting the three most popular variety shows at one point in time. The sudden cancellation of these variety shows left him jobless for three months, which he refers to as the bleakest moment in his career. During this time period, he also played the male leading role in the idol drama Hi Working Girl, co-starring with Jolin Tsai. The two formed a lasting friendship from this collaboration.

2003–2007: Avex Taiwan, Show Time, Expert Show, Hypnosis Show, Speshow and Show Your Dance 
In 2003, Show signed with Avex Taiwan and launched his solo career with the release of his first album Show Time, selling over 80,000 copies.

His second album, Expert Show, was released in 2004. The leading dance track "機器娃娃" (Robot Doll), is a hip hop number about the prevalence of electronic pets and on-line relationships. He collaborated with his co-host Dee Shu on the duet "Love Expert" (恋爱达人).

Show released his third album Hypnosis Show in 2005. He collaborated with Jolin Tsai for the first lead dance track "Destined Guy" (真命天子).

The year after, he released his fourth album Speshow on November 17, 2006. The lead track, "Dance Gate" (精舞门) is a cover of "James Dean (I Wanna Know)" by Daniel Bedingfield. The Music Video features Show Lo's iconic 椅子舞 (chair dance) and him showing off his versatility, performing various dance styles. For the album, he sang a full length English song for the first time, "Twinkle", with Japanese singer Koda Kumi.

Show released his fifth album Show Your Dance on November 16, 2007; he sang the duet "Defeat in Love" (败给你) with Elva Hsiao.

2008–Present: Gold Typhoon, Trendy Man, Rashomon, Only for You and 9ood Show 
In 2008 Show joined forces with Gold Typhoon (Taiwan) and released his sixth album Trendy Man. On September 19, 2009, Show represented Taiwan and performed at the 6th Asia Song Festival, held at the Seoul World Cup Stadium in South Korea. The seventh album, Rashomon, was released in 2010, which held the number one spot on G-music, and the album sold 150,000 copies.

Show released his eighth studio album, Only for You was released in February 18, 2011, which the album sold more than 150,000 copies. Show's ninth album, 9ood Show was released on April 6, 2012. For this album, Show and his partner Rainie Yang teamed up with Tourism Australia to film a short romance film featuring tourist attractions in Melbourne, Tasmania, and Sydney.

In November 2012, Show announced his new world tour "Over The Limit", starting from January 2013 at Taipei Arena.

2011–present: Pony Canyon, Dante and "THE SHOW" 
In 2011, Show signed with Pony Canyon Japan. His first Japanese single "Dante" was released on February 15, 2012. This song made it to the 5th place in Japan's Oricon daily chart during its first day of release, and hit 10th place in the Oricon weekly chart. This record made Show the first Taiwanese male singer to be on the Oricon chart after Teresa Teng.

On June 20, 2012, his second Japanese single "Magic" was released.

His Japanese studio album "THE SHOW" was released on September 19, 2012. However, the planned trip to Japan to promote his album was not eventuated due to political uproar over the Senkaku Islands between Japan, Taiwan and China.

2013–2014: Sony Music, Lion Roar 
In August 2013 Show had joined Sony Music along with Elva Hsiao. He went on a Japanese Tour with partner Rainie Yang to make up for the cancelled tour in 2011. He also released the tenth album Lion Roar, which became the fourth consecutive album to reach over 150,000 copies. In the album, he wrote Taiwanese lyrics for the love song "You Are Mine", which is his first Taiwanese hip-hop song. In his words, the song is about the kind of love that never ends and continues beyond this life, written based on his own experience of a love as deep as that of his parents.

In December 2013, Show announced his new encore world tour of "Over The Limit — Dance Soul Returns", starting from January 2014 in Kaohsiung Arena.

2014–2019: EMI Music Taiwan, Reality Show? 

In 2014, Show joined EMI Music Taiwan along with Rainie Yang and A-mei.

In 2015, he joined the famous Chinese variety show Go Fighting! with Zhang Yi Xing, Sun Honglei, Huang Lei, Huang Bo and Wang Xun.

Show Luo's eleventh album Reality Show? was released on November 20, 2015. The title is derived from Show's personal reflection on his persona, commenting that what he presents has elements of both 'Reality' and of putting on a 'Show'. He co-wrote the music and lyrics for the leading track, "Let Go", which discusses the issue of cyber-bullying. The music video depicts three subjects representing the demographics most vulnerable to cyber-bullying.

Show also created his artist management company, Creation, signing on Linda Chien, his co-host on 100% Entertainment, re-branding her from a children's television presenter to a singer.

2020–present: Controversy and musical comeback 
In April 2020, Lo became the subject of significant controversy, for his infidelity and improper behavior with women during a long-term relationship with Chow. Lo reportedly lost  in appearance fees and endorsements, as companies began removing him from broadcasts and advertisements, including Produce Camp 2020 and Go Fighting!. He staged a comeback on November 20, 2021, with the release of a new song, "Trap Game."

Personal life 
Lo publicly dated Grace Chow (Zhou Yangqing), a Chinese fashion blogger, from 2015 to 2020.

On April 23, 2020, Lo courted significant controversy after Chow accused Lo of serial infidelity and improper behavior with several women, including artists signed under his entertainment agency. Lo apologized to Chow via an online post the next day. On April 25, Linda Chien also posted an apology on Instagram, for being a third party to Lo's affairs.

Discography 

 Show Time (2003)
 Expert Show (2004)
 Hypnosis Show (2005)
 Speshow (2006)
 Show Your Dance (2007)
 Trendy Man (2008)
 Rashomon (2010)
 Only for You (2011)
 Good Show (2012)
 The Show (2012)
 Lion Roar (2013)
 Reality Show? (2015)
 No Idea (2019)

World tours

Filmography

Television series

Feature film

Short film

Host

Books 
 September 30, 2002 – Zhu Shi Hui She (autobiography) 
 October 9, 2007 – Show on Stage (残酷舞台) (concert)
 December 24, 2010 – Logic (罗辑课) (co-written with his mother)
 August 7, 2014 – Dream Puzzle (极限拼图)

Awards and nominations

References

External links 

 
 
 
 

1979 births
Living people
20th-century Taiwanese male actors
21st-century Taiwanese male actors
20th-century Taiwanese male singers
21st-century Taiwanese male singers
Amis people
Businesspeople from Taipei
Male actors from Keelung
Musicians from Keelung
Taiwanese Buddhists
Taiwanese idols
Taiwanese male television actors
Taiwanese male film actors
Taiwanese male dancers
Taiwanese Mandopop singers